Scotty Finds a Home is a 1935 reel animated cartoon directed by Burt Gillett and produced for RKO Radio Pictures, which was later re-released by Walter O. Gutlohn Inc.

Plot 
A young anthropomorphic kitten wants a pet. He happens to find a Scottish Terrier with no owner and takes him in. When the dog, now named "Scotty" tracks mud into the house, the kitten's grandmother says that her grandson cannot keep him. Scotty is thrown out of the house. After some time, a transient bulldog is walking by as the kitten's grandmother puts a pie in the window sill to cool. He barges into the house and terrorizes the family, demanding they feed him. Scotty rushes back to the house and saves the family; Grandma decides that they can keep him after all.

References

External links 
 

1930s American animated films
1930s English-language films
1935 animated films
1935 short films
American animated short films
Animated films about cats
Animated films about dogs
Films directed by Burt Gillett
RKO Pictures animated short films
RKO Pictures short films